The Uganda Rugby Union is the governing body for rugby union in Uganda.  It was established in 1959 and is responsible for organising local competitions and the Rugby Cranes national representative team.  The URU is a member of both World Rugby and Rugby Africa.

External links
Uganda Rugby Union Official Site

Rugby union in Uganda
Rugby union governing bodies in Africa
Sports organizations established in 1959